Freziera obovata is a species of plant in the Pentaphylacaceae family. It is endemic to Ecuador.

References

Endemic flora of Ecuador
obovata
Vulnerable plants
Taxonomy articles created by Polbot